Gerhard Winther (12 May 1913 – 28 August 1987) was a Norwegian race walker. He was born in Trondheim, and represented the sports club Trondhjems Gangklubb. He competed at the 1948 Summer Olympics in London, and at the 1952 Summer Olympics in Helsinki.

References

1913 births
1987 deaths
Sportspeople from Trondheim
Norwegian male racewalkers
Athletes (track and field) at the 1948 Summer Olympics
Athletes (track and field) at the 1952 Summer Olympics
Olympic athletes of Norway